128P/Shoemaker–Holt, also known as Shoemaker-Holt 1, is a periodic comet in the Solar System. The comet passed close to Jupiter in 1982 and was discovered in 1987. The comet was last observed in March 2018.

The nucleus was split into two pieces (A+B) during the 1997 apparition. Fragment A was last observed in 1996 and only has a 79-day observation arc. Fragment B is estimated to be 4.6 km in diameter.

References

External links 
 Orbital simulation from JPL (Java) / Horizons Ephemeris
 128P/Shoemaker-Holt 1 – Seiichi Yoshida @ aerith.net
 128P at Kronk's Cometography

Periodic comets
0128
Split comets
128P
128P
128P
Comets in 2017
19871018